The Crowfoot Formation is a stratigraphical unit of Frasnian age in the Western Canadian Sedimentary Basin. 

It takes the name from Crowfoot Creek, a tributary of the Bow River and was first described in the Royalite Crowfoot No. 2 well, located near the creek by H.R. Belyea and D.J. McLaren in 1957.

Lithology
The Crowfoot Formation consists of anhydrite, silty dolomite, with minor shale.

Distribution

Relationship to other units

The Crowfoot Formation is overlain by the Stettler Formation and overlays the Southesk Formation.

It is equivalent to the Calmar Formation and part of the Graminia Formation in central Alberta and to the Torquay Formation in Saskatchewan, Manitoba and Montana.

References

Devonian Alberta
Western Canadian Sedimentary Basin